Blood of My Enemy is the fifth studio album by American deathcore band Winds of Plague. The album was released on October 27, 2017 through Entertainment One Music and Good Fight Entertainment. It is the band's first album not to be released through Century Media Records.

Background and promotion
A music video was released for the song "Never Alone" on September 22, 2017 via the band's official YouTube channel. The song was one of the first to be written for the album, with vocalist Johnny Plague referring to the song as a balancing point for the remaining songs, stating "It's not the heaviest song of the record and it isn't the most melodic song of the record."

Track listing

Personnel
Winds of Plague
 Jonathan "Johnny Plague" Cooke-Hayden – unclean vocals, bass
 Michael Montoya – lead guitar
 Justin Bock – rhythm guitar, bass
 Art Cruz – drums, percussion
 Adrienne Cowan – keyboards, clean vocals

Additional personnel
 Joakim Karlsson and Noah Sebastian – production, engineering
 Chris Collier – drum engineering
 Will Putney – mastering, mixing
 Jason Malhoyt and Davis Rider – management
 Carl Severson – A&R
 Pär Olofsson – artwork

References

2017 albums
Winds of Plague albums
MNRK Music Group albums
Albums with cover art by Pär Olofsson